George Forbes (born 29 November 1868) was an Irish international footballer who played as a full back.

Career
Born in Canada, Forbes settled in Ireland, and played club football with Limavady United, St Columb's Court, Distillery and Glentoran.

He also earned three caps for Ireland between 1888 and 1891.

After finishing his playing career, Forbes returned to Canada.

References
NIFG profile

1868 births
Irish association footballers (before 1923)
Pre-1950 IFA international footballers
Lisburn Distillery F.C. players
Glentoran F.C. players
Limavady United F.C. players
Year of death missing
Association football fullbacks